The Visonta Coal Mine ([]) is an open pit lignite mine located near Gyöngyös, Heves County, in Hungary. It is the smallest lignite mine in Hungary out of three lignite mines in total. The mine has coal reserves amounting to 400 million tonnes of lignite, one of the largest coal reserves in Europe and the world and has an annual production of 3.9 million tonnes of coal.

Location and structure 

The mine has five sections that surround the municipality of Detk. The West Pit is the smallest, and oldest section of the mine, and located north west of Visonta. The regular mining began in the West Pit section in 1969. As of 2022, the West Pit section has been fully recultivated as a step towards the mine's reclamation. East of the West Pit section is the East Pit I section, that borders the Mátra Power Plant in the north, and the municipality of Halmajugra in the south west. As of 2022, the East Pit I section is being recultivated. East of the East Pit I section is the East Pit II section that is bordered by Detk in the south, and the Tarnóca river in the east. As of 2019, the East Pit II section is partially recultivated, but still used for piling overburden with stackers (see fig. 2–5).

The main road 3 is built around the South Pit. As of 2022, the South Pit is being recultivated. The East Pit III section is currently (2022) in operation. It is located east of the East Pit II section. It is bordered to the east by the municipalities of Kófalu, Kápolna and Kompolt.

History 

The construction of the Mátra Power Plant began in 1964. Around the same time, the exploitation of the West Pit section with core drillings commenced, which marked the beginning of the industrial open pit coal mining in Hungary. The regular mining began in 1969. The mining equipment was supplied by former East German surface mining equipment manufacturer Takraf. In July 1971, a bucket excavator sustained structural damage, which was believed to be caused by a design flaw. However, the cause for the accident was never found. Between 1979 and 1983, the East Pit II section was prepared for commercial mining by pumping out the groundwater, commercial operating began in 1982. In 1985, the West Pit section was fully exploited; at the same time, the East Pit I section was about two thirds exploited. In 2005, the East Pit I and II sections were fully exploited. Until 2021, lignite was only mined in the South Pit section. In the mid-2010s, the East Pit III section was prepared for commercial operation; by 2018, it was 70 per cent completed, and by 2021, it was operational. In 2020, a 20 MWp photovoltaic power station was installed in the South Pit section on the overburden.

Operator 

The Visonta Coal Mine is operated by Mátrai Erőmű Zrt., a closely held joint-stock company; most of its shares were owned by EP Holding and Lőrinc Mészáros from 2017 until 2020. Since 2020, the power plant has been owned by state-owned MVM Zrt.

Deposit geology 

The mine is located in the western section of the eastern Mátraalja coalfield in the Pannonian Basin. It is likely that the Mátraalja coalfield developed in the Pliocene, or possibly even later in the Miocene in a river delta. The layers are mostly composed of grey and greyish blue claystone with partial sandstone layers and lenticular lignite beds.

There are six lignite beds in the region: -II, -I, 0, I, II, and III, with the latter being the deepest bed, and -II being the upmost bed. For economical reasons, only the 0, I, and II beds are mined (as of 2019). Statistically, this amount of lignite will be sufficient for firing the Mátra Power Plant until at least 2108 (data from 2008).

South Pit geology 

This sand layer has, due to calcium carbonate coagulation from seepage water, several irregularly occurring sandstone sections with a tickness that lies typically in the  range.

It is present in the entire site, except the western part of the South Pit section. Below the 0 lignite bed, the site contains claystone layers. It was mined using smaller excavators. This makes it uneconomical to mine. However, it was nonetheless mined in sections with a thickness of at least  using conventional excavators because of its high lower heating value.

The layers have a 0.5 to 2.5° inclination on the south-(east) axis, and no faults.

East Pit III geology 

As in the South Pit section, most of the lignite is contained in the 0, I, and II lignite beds. Unlike in the South Pit section, the East Pit III's -II lignite bed is mineable; it contains about 25 per cent of the East Pit III's lignite. The East Pit III is depicted in figures 1-3 and 1–4.

The -II lignite bed is split in a lower and an upper bed; these two beds merge in the eastern part of the East Pit III section, where the thickness of the bed can exceed . The upper bed is present in the south east of the East Pit III section, whereas the lower bed is present in the entire East Pit III section. The bottom part of these layers contain sand without sandstone. The 0 bed is also separated into an upper and a lower bed, with non-lignite layers in between. The thickness of these beds is inconsistent; exploratory drilling results indicate that the beds may merge and diverge at several parts of the East Pit III. The merged bed is mostly present in the south and east of the East Pit III section.

The I bed is, just like the 0 and -II beds, split in an upper and a lower bed. It also has a small upper bed, and a thick lower bed.

The layers have a 1.5 to 3.0° inclination on the south-(east) axis, and apparently, no faults.

Lignite properties 

The mined lignite is earthy-brown, wooden soft brown coal of low quality. The average lower heating value is only . This is only one third of the lower heating value of the lignite found in West Hungary near Tatabánya.

Mining technique 

Since 2006, swivel mining in combination with a conveyor belt overburden transport system has been used. The mining is conducted in clockwise direction. Many mining machines used in the Visonta Coal Mine were made by Takraf in former East Germany. In total, five bucket excavators (see figures 2-1 and 2–6) are used to remove the sand layers covering the lignite beds. In total, six stackers (see fig. 2–3) are used to pile the overburden; one bucket excavator and one stacker have been, since 1972, directly connected in a "direct piling combination" of the SRsh type that was developed by Takraf for the Visonta Coal Mine in the late 1960s.

The sandstone layers above the 0 bed is mined by contractors using conventional excavators and offroad lorries in a so-called shovel-and-truck operation. The same technique also used by contractors to mine lignite where using bucket dredgers is unfeasible. Most of the lignite that is mined using this technique is transported onto the II lignite bed where it is eventually mined with a bucket dredger. Most of the lignite (90 per cent) is thus mined with bucket dredgers. In total, three bucket dredgers (see fig. 2–4) with benches are used, which can each excavate  of lignite everyday.

The Visonta Coal Mine's workers work in a 24/7/365 shift system with three eight hour shifts everyday. Sunday is a regular work day. In 2009, Mátrai Erőmű Zrt. had 917 employees who worked in the Visonta Coal Mine. The bucket dredgers excavated  of lignite, including most of the  lignite excavated with recular excavators.

Lignite usage 

The Mátra Power Plant is a combined lignite-natural-gas-biomass power plant with a power output of 0.95 GW. It generates about 13 per cent of the electric power of Hungary, which makes it the biggest fossile fuel power plant in Hungary. It was synchronised with the power grid on 19 June 1969. Originally, the plant had a power output of 0.8 GW with two 100 MW generators and three 200 MW generators that were built between 1969 and 1972. From 1986 until 1992, the plant was modernised and had its three 200 MW turbines replaced with more efficient units. From 1998 until 2000, a FGD system was installed for the 200 MW units to improve the exhaust gas quality, and the power output of the 200 MW turbines was increased by 10 and 16 per cent. By 2003, the 100 MW units' FGD systems were also completed.

In 2007, two 33 MW gas turbines were installed that run on natural gas. About 10 per cent of the solid fuel burnt in the Mátra Power Plant is biomass (in 2019). From 2015 until 2017, the 200 MW turbines were modernised once more; the gas turbines were modernised in 2019. The plant's primary fuel will be lignite until 2025 (as of 2021); originally, it was planned to use lignite at least until 2030. After the MVM purchase in 2020, it was decided to convert the plant into a mostly natural gas-fired plant because of the aging equipment and the high carbon dioxide emissions caused by using lignite as fuel; the Mátrai Power Plant produces about 14 per cent of the annual Hungarian carbon dioxide emissions. It is said that a 500 MW natural gas turbine will be put into operation in 2025. It will be assisted by the photovoltaic power plant in the former South Pit section. The resources extracted from the plant's exhaust gasses are used to manufacture plasterboard and cement.

The Mátrai Power Plant is an important economical factor for the Gyöngyös region. In the 2008 fiscal year, Mátrai Erőmű Zrt. had a revenue of 86.9 bio. Ft. The industrial estate surrounding the power plant had 1871 employees (in 2008), and generated a revenue of 37.7 bio. Ft.

Environmental impact 

The pumping out of the groundwater affects the groundwater levels of the municipalities of Visonta, Halmajugra, Detk, Karácsond, Nagyfüged, Nagyút, Tarnazsadány, Tarnabod, Kompolt, Kápolna, Tófalu and Aldebrí, which damages buildings in these municipalities. Mátrai Erőmű Zrt. pays compensation for severe damage caused by mining.

External links

References 

Coal mines in Hungary